History Is All You Left Me is a young adult novel by Adam Silvera, published January 17, 2017 by Soho Teen.

Reception 
History Is All You Left Me received starred reviews from Booklist, Publishers Weekly, School Library Journal, and Kirkus, as well as positive reviews from The Bulletin of the Center for Children’s Books and The Horn Book Magazine. The book is a Junior Library Guild selection.

Before publication, Paste, Kirkus Reviews, and Entertainment Weekly named it one of the most anticipated young adult novels of the year following his 2015 debut, More Happy Than Not.

Booklist revered the book, saying that "splendid sophomore novel is filled with tantalizing questions about lies and honesty, love and loss, and past and present, with answers gradually metered out through Griffin’s growth as well as that of the other characters populating this beautifully realized, character-driven work of literary fiction."

Kirkus applauded Silvera's writing, noting, "The conversational yet profound tone of the book highlights the author’s ear for the musicality of language and his ability to convey deep emotion through attention to its cadence and flow." Publishers Weekly echoed the sentiment, stating that Silvera "excels at capturing the confusion and pain [the main character] feels."

The audiobook, narrated by Tom Picasso, received a mixed review from Booklist, who noted that "Picasso captures Griffin’s adolescent grief and depression with heartbreaking realism. He also gives Theo a distinctive, noticeably deeper voice and thankfully avoids a stereotyping sound for sidekick Wade, who’s African American.  Picasso is less adept at creating an individual voice for Jackson, Theo’s California boyfriend, making Griffin’s imagined conversations between himself, Jackson, and Theo confusing at times.  Picasso also misreads some text (unites for unties, for instance)."

TIME and Entertainment Weekly named History Is All You Left Me one of the best young adult books of the year.

Beyond popular media, History Is All You Left Me has been analyzed academically for its portrayal of queerness, written by a gay author.

References 

Soho Press books
2017 children's books
2017 LGBT-related literary works
2010s LGBT novels
Novels set in Los Angeles
Novels set in New York City